The following is a list of patriarchs of All Bulgaria, heads of the Bulgarian Orthodox Church. The Bulgarian Orthodox Church was recognized as an autocephalous archbishopric in 870. In 918 or 919 the Bulgarian monarch Simeon I ( 893–927) summoned a church council to raise the Bulgarian Archbishopric to a completely independent patriarchate. With the Byzantine–Bulgarian Treaty of 927, which affirmed the Bulgarian victory over the Byzantine Empire in the War of 913–927, the Ecumenical Patriarch of Constantinople recognized the Bulgarian Patriarchate.

List

See also 

 Patriarch of All Bulgaria
 Bulgarian Orthodox Church
 Bulgarian Exarchate

Citations

Sources 
 

Bulgarian Orthodox Church
Primates of the Bulgarian Orthodox Church
Bulgaria
Bulgarian
Patriarchs